Karen McQuestion is an American fiction writer who has written books for adults, children and teens. Most of her books include elements of humor or fantasy. Her books have sold over a million copies  and translation rights to her books have sold for Germany, Turkey, South Korea, and Poland. McQuestion lives in Hartland, Wisconsin.

McQuestion is an advocate of self-publishing. After selling 30,000 copies of her self-published books, she signed a contract with Amazon's first publishing imprint, AmazonEncore to re-release her novel A Scattered Life. McQuestion was the first author who self-published through Amazon's Kindle Direct Publishing platform to secure a movie deal. 
  McQuestion later acknowledged that the option period for the movie deal had expired, and as of May 6, 2013, no information on a film version of A Scattered Life can be found on IMDB.

Jeff Belle, vice president of Amazon Publishing, stated that they discovered McQuestion's books through the use of Kindle and sales data, as well as through positive reader reviews. As of February, 2014, A Scattered Life has reportedly sold more than 190,000 copies.

McQuestion's novel, The Long Way Home, was cited as being one of Amazon Publishing's greatest successes, having sold more than 200,000 copies as of November 2013.

Works

Books for adults

A Scattered Life
Easily Amused
The Long Way Home
Hello Love
Half a Heart (2018)
Good Man, Dalton (2019)
Missing Her More (2019 sequel to "Good Man, Dalton")
Dovetail (2020)

Books for teenagers

Favorite
Life on Hold
Edgewood (Book One in the Edgewood Series)
Wanderlust (Book Two in the Edgewood Series)
Absolution (Book Three in the Edgewood Series)
Revelation (Book Four in the Edgewood Series)
The Moonlight Child

Books for children

Celia and the Fairies
Secrets of the Magic Ring

References

External links
 
 Karen McQuestion at Amazon
 
 

Living people
Novelists from Wisconsin
21st-century American novelists
American women novelists
21st-century American women writers
Year of birth missing (living people)
Place of birth missing (living people)
People from Hartland, Wisconsin